Anton Fran Wagner (* 1712 (Wiener Neustadt), † 1782, Ljubljana)  was a politician of the 18th century in Slovenia, when the country was under the Holy Roman Empire. He became mayor of Ljubljana in 1775. He was succeeded by Janez Friderik Egger in 1782. He was also a pharmacist.

References

Mayors of places in the Holy Roman Empire
Mayors of Ljubljana
Year of birth missing
Year of death missing
18th-century Slovenian people
Slovenian pharmacists